WJCC (1700 kHz) is an AM radio station licensed to Miami Springs, Florida, United States. It broadcasts a world ethnic format.

History

WJCC originated as the expanded band "twin" of an existing station on the standard AM band.

On March 17, 1997, the FCC announced that eighty-eight stations been given permission to move to newly available "Expanded Band" transmitting frequencies, ranging from 1610 to 1700 kHz, with then-WCMQ authorized to move from 1210 to 1700 kHz. The call sign for the original WCMQ on 1210 AM was changed to WNMA on November 25, 1997, thus allowing a Construction Permit for the expanded band station on 1700 AM to inherit the historic WCMQ call letters on December 5, 1997.

AM 1700's call letters were changed to WRNU on February 1, 1999, and to WAFN on September 9, 1999. The station is notable as the first broadcasting home of South Florida sports radio personality Jorge Sedano, who began his career in 1999 as a host/update anchor/producer at the station, then known as WAFN 1700 "The Fan." He went on to a successful radio career with the Fox Radio Sports Network, and is currently a radio and television personality at ESPN. During its time as "The Fan," WAFN 1700 carried programming from New York's "Sports Radio 66 and 101.9 FM" (WFAN (AM) and WFAN-FM), and also carried the controversial Don Imus morning show.

AM 1700's call letters were changed again, to WJCC, on October 30, 2001. The FCC's initial policy for expanded band stations was that both the original station and its expanded band counterpart could operate simultaneously for up to five years, after which owners would have to turn in one of the two licenses, depending on whether they preferred the new assignment or elected to remain on the original frequency. Due to this requirement, WJCC was deleted on February 23, 2006. However, numerous other joint standard/expanded band station pairs had been permitted to operate beyond the initial five-year deadline, and a petition to resume operations was granted, with WJCC's license restored on October 4, 2012. Since then the FCC deadline has been extended multiple times, and both stations have remained authorized. One restriction is that the FCC has generally required paired original and expanded band stations to remain under common ownership.

References

External links

JCC
Multicultural Broadcasting stations